Hettiarachchi is a surname. Notable people with the surname include:

Dinuka Hettiarachchi (born 1976), Sri Lankan cricketer
Gamini Hettiarachchi (1950–2019), Sri Lankan actor
Indradasa Hettiarachchi, Sri Lankan politician
Sunil Hettiarachchi (born 1937), Sri Lankan comedian and actor
U. Hettiarachchi, Sri Lankan cricketer